Camp Hearne, located in Hearne, Texas was a prisoner-of-war camp during the Second World War. Commissioned in 1942, Camp Hearne was one of the few camps that housed prisoners from all three Axis powers during the conflict. After its decommissioning and piecemeal sell-off by the United States government, the site remained abandoned for 70 years. Today there stands a single replica of a barracks on the site of the former camp, which contains a museum.

The camp also served as the central prisoner of war postal service, "responsible for the distribution of all mail to POWs in the United States."  According to Krammer, in their spare time, the German POWs "painstakingly constructed replicas of old German castles - waist high - down to the detailed turrets and moats, and a curious visitor to the old camp site can still examine a medieval little schloss rising just above the weedtops in a corner of the empty landscape where the camp used to be."  Unfortunately, the period was marred by at least one escape attempt, a suicide, and a murder of a perceived American collaborator.

Some residents said that the German prisoners of war were treated too well and therefore called the camp "The Fritz Ritz" in reference to the luxury hotel chain.

The German writer Hannes Köhler put Camp Hearne and the events among German prisoners of war at the centre of his 2018 novel "Ein mögliches Leben" (One possible Life).

See also
List of World War II prisoner-of-war camps in the United States
German prisoners of war in the United States

References

Prisoner of war camps in the United States
Museums in Robertson County, Texas
1942 establishments in Texas